Jennifer 'Jenny' Palmer (born 1 May 1959) is an Ulster Unionist Party (UUP) politician who served as a Member of the Northern Ireland Assembly (MLA) for Lagan Valley from 2016 to 2017.

Palmer is well known for her defection from the Democratic Unionist Party (DUP), following the Red Sky scandal.

References

1959 births
Living people
Ulster Unionist Party MLAs
Democratic Unionist Party politicians
Northern Ireland MLAs 2016–2017
Female members of the Northern Ireland Assembly
People from Lisburn